Huntersville Colored High School, also known as Torrence-Lytle High School, is a historic high school complex located at Huntersville, Mecklenburg County, North Carolina. The main building is a variegated red brick, Colonial Revival main block built in 1937 with two-story International Style wings constructed in 1957. The original section was built under the auspices of the Public Works Administration.  Also on the property is the elementary school building built in 1953 and a gymnasium built in 1957.  The elementary school is a long, one-story, rectangular, red brick building. The complex continued to function as a public school until 1966.

It was added to the National Register of Historic Places in 2009.

References

High schools in North Carolina
African-American history of North Carolina
Public Works Administration in North Carolina
School buildings on the National Register of Historic Places in North Carolina
International style architecture in North Carolina
Colonial Revival architecture in North Carolina
School buildings completed in 1937
Schools in Mecklenburg County, North Carolina
National Register of Historic Places in Mecklenburg County, North Carolina
Defunct schools in North Carolina